Brantley Dam is a flood-control and irrigation water-storage dam on the Pecos River in Eddy County, New Mexico, about  north of Carlsbad, New Mexico, and  upstream from Avalon Dam.

Background

In the 1960s, the McMillan Reservoir was silting up, reducing its storage capacity. A 1964 study of the McMillan and Avalon Dams concluded: "a potential flood would exceed existing spillway capacity at McMillan Dam and cause the dam to be overtopped, which would cause the failure of both dams." In 1967, the Bureau of Reclamation issued a report proposing a new dam between Avalon and McMillan that would completely inundate the McMillan reservoir. Congressional approval for the project was given in 1972, with about $45 million of federal funding authorized.  Planning continued throughout the 1970s.

By the early 1980s, land had been acquired, the site was cleared, and archaeological mitigation work was underway.
Utility lines were moved, highways US 285 and NM 137 were rerouted, and a $15,000,000 realignment of the Santa Fe Railway was constructed.
In 1984, construction on the dam began.  Concrete work was completed by autumn 1987, and soon after, the Pecos River was diverted through the new Brantley floodgates for the first time. That winter, another channel was dredged through the McMillan silt to ease the water flow into Brantley.

Structure

Reservoir

Benefits include irrigation, flood control, fish and wildlife enhancement, and recreation. 
A part of the dam and surrounding land form the Brantley Lake State Park.
Brantley Lake has  of capacity assigned to flood-control functions.

References 

 

Dams in New Mexico
United States Bureau of Reclamation dams
Dams completed in 1987
Buildings and structures in Eddy County, New Mexico
Dams on the Pecos River
1987 establishments in New Mexico